The Institute of Brunei Technical Education is a post-secondary institution providing technical and vocational education in Brunei. IBTE was created on May 27, 2014 from the merger of the Department of Technical Education and seven technical and vocational schools nationwide.

Institutions 
Since 2016, the seven schools under IBTE have been restructured into two cluster of schools, namely IBTE Central and IBTE Satellite. The schools have also been renamed so as to reflect better their merger under one umbrella institution, taking up the terms 'IBTE' and 'Campus' as part of the new names.

References

External links 
 IBTE official website

 
Universities and colleges in Brunei
Vocational education in Asia
Educational institutions established in 2014
2014 establishments in Brunei